Zhubi is a surname. Notable people with the surname include:

Mentor Zhubi (born 1984), Swedish Futsal and football player
Petrit Zhubi (born 1988), Swedish footballer, brother of Mentor

See also
Zhubei
Zhubi River

Albanian-language surnames